Aragón metro station is a Mexico City Metro station within the limits of Gustavo A. Madero and Venustiano Carranza, in Mexico City. It is an at-grade station with one island platform, served by Line 5 (the Yellow Line), between Eduardo Molina and Oceanía stations. Aragón station serves the colonias of Casas Alemán and Simón Bolívar. The station is named after the San Juan de Aragón Park, and its pictogram represents the silhouette of a squirrel. Aragón metro station was opened on 19 December 1981, on the first day of the Consulado–Pantitlán service. In 2019, the station had an average daily ridership of 7,547 passengers, making it the 172nd busiest station in the network and the eighth busiest of the line.

Location

Aragón is a metro station located on Río Consulado Avenue, in northeastern Mexico City. The station serves the colonias (Mexican Spanish for "neighborhoods") of Casas Alemán, in Gustavo A. Madero, and Simón Bolívar, in Venustiano Carranza. Within the system, the station lies between Eduardo Molina and Oceanía stations. The area is serviced by Route 200 of the Red de Transporte de Pasajeros network and by Route 20-B of the city's public bus system.

Exits
There are two exits:
North: Río Consulado Avenue and Dólares Street, Casas Alemán, Gustavo A. Madero.
South: Río Consulado Avenue and Peniques Street, Simón Bolívar, Venustiano Carranza.

History and construction
Line 5 of the Mexico City Metro was built by Cometro, a subsidiary of Empresas ICA, and its first section was opened on 19 December 1981, operating from Pantitlán to Consulado stations. The Aragón–Eduardo Molina section measures .
Aragón metro station is located at grade; the station's pictogram represents a squirrel, and the station is named after , a public park and zoo in Gustavo A. Madero, located approximately one kilometer away, because it was the closest station when it was built, a function replaced by the Bosque de Aragón metro station.

Incidents
After the 2015 Oceanía station train crash, Aragón station was temporarily closed for repairs. From 23 April to 15 June 2020, the station was temporarily closed due to the COVID-19 pandemic in Mexico.

Ridership
According to the data provided by the authorities since the 2000s, commuters have averaged per year between 3,900 and 8,600 daily entrances in the last decade. In 2019, before the impact of the COVID-19 pandemic on public transport, the station's ridership totaled 2,754,754 passengers, which was an increase of 21,253 passengers compared to 2018. In the same year, Aragón metro station was the 172nd busiest station of the system's 195 stations, and it was the line's 8th busiest.

Notes

References

External links

1981 establishments in Mexico
Mexico City Metro Line 5 stations
Mexico City Metro stations in Gustavo A. Madero, Mexico City
Mexico City Metro stations in Venustiano Carranza, Mexico City
Railway stations opened in 1981